Khalanga is market center in Sharada Municipality in Salyan District of Karnali Province of Nepal. The place formerly existing as Village Development Committee was annexed to form a new municipality since 18 May 2014. It is the district headquarter of Salyan District. At the time of the 1991 Nepal census it had a population of 6380.

Media
To Promote local culture Khalanga has one FM radio station Radio Salyan FM - 101 MHz Which is a Community radio Station.

References

External links
UN map of the municipalities of Salyan District

Populated places in Salyan District, Nepal